Joe Cofie (born 1 January 1946) is a Ghanaian boxer. He competed in the men's featherweight event at the 1972 Summer Olympics. At the 1972 Summer Olympics, he lost in his first fight to Orlando Palacios of Cuba.

References

1946 births
Living people
Ghanaian male boxers
Olympic boxers of Ghana
Boxers at the 1972 Summer Olympics
Place of birth missing (living people)
Featherweight boxers